Rothenburg is a German language placename and refers to:

Places
Rothenburg ob der Tauber, Bavaria, Germany
Rothenburg, Oberlausitz, Saxony, Germany
Rothenburg, Saxony-Anhalt, Saxony-Anhalt, Germany
Rothenburg, Switzerland, Canton of Lucerne, Switzerland
Rothenburg (Lothringen), a castle ruin in Lorraine, France
Rothenburg (Thüringen), a castle ruin in Thuringia, Germany
Rothenburg an der Oder, the German name of Czerwieńsk, Poland

People with the surname
Glenn Rothenburg, the birthname of American actor Glenn Corbett (1930–1993)
Heinz-Joachim Rothenburg (born 1944), East German shot putter
Karl Rothenburg (1894–1941), German Wehrmacht officer

See also
Meir of Rothenburg (Maharam of Rothenburg, 1215–1293), a major medieval German rabbi
Rotenburg (disambiguation)
Rottenburg (disambiguation)
Rothenberg (disambiguation)
Rotenberg (disambiguation)